Mehmood Bhatti is a Pakistani-French fashion designer.

Biography
Mehmood was born in Lahore, Pakistan, and graduated from Government College University. Bhatti immigrated to France in 1976, where he married a French woman and established himself as a fashion designer. In 1977, he left for Paris to pursue an MBA without having the necessary financial resources. However, he found employment in a retail store, first as a cleaner, then as a packer, before becoming a salesman. His multi-national company, Bhatti, is located in ten countries and achieves an annual turnover of more than twenty million euros.
On March 23, 2004, Bhatti was awarded the Sitara-i-Imtiaz, Pakistan's third highest award and the highest award given to a civilian.

References

Pakistani emigrants to France
French fashion designers
Pakistani fashion designers
Living people
French people of Punjabi descent
People from Lahore
1958 births